1028 Lydina, provisional designation , is a carbonaceous background asteroid and member of the Cybele group from the outermost regions of the asteroid belt, approximately  in diameter. It was discovered at the Simeiz Observatory on the Crimean peninsula on 6 November 1923, by Soviet astronomer Vladimir Albitsky, who named it after his wife, Lydia Il'inichna Albitskaya. The dark C-type asteroid has a rotation period of 11.68 hours.

Orbit and classification 

Lydina is a non-family asteroid from the main belt's background population when applying the hierarchical clustering method to its proper orbital elements. Based on osculating Keplerian orbital elements, the asteroid is considered a member of the dynamical Cybele group, which are asteroid with low orbital inclinations and eccentricities, and with a semi-major axis between 3.3 and 3.5 AU, near the 4:7 orbital resonance with Jupiter.

It orbits the Sun in the outermost asteroid belt at a distance of 3.0–3.8 AU once every 6 years and 3 months (2,297 days; semi-major axis of 3.41 AU). Its orbit has an eccentricity of 0.11 and an inclination of 9° with respect to the ecliptic.

Physical characteristics 

In the Tholen, Lydina is a carbonaceous C-type asteroid.

Rotation period 

In November 2011, a rotational lightcurve of Lydina was obtained from photometric observations by Robert Stephens at his Santana Observatory  in California. Lightcurve analysis gave a well-defined rotation period of 11.680 hours with a brightness variation of 0.22 magnitude. Observations at the Italian Bassano Bresciano Observatory in December 2011 measured a concurring period 11.674 with an amplitude of 0.30 magnitude. A previous observations at the Pico dos Dias Observatory , Brasil, gave a period of 15.69 hours, which Stephens interpreted as a 4:3-alias period solution of his results. A provisional lightcurve from March 2007, obtained by French amateur astronomers Pierre Antonini and Jean-Gabriel Bosch (48 hours) is of poor quality.

Diameter and albedo 

According to the surveys carried out by the Infrared Astronomical Satellite IRAS, the Japanese Akari satellite and the NEOWISE mission of NASA's Wide-field Infrared Survey Explorer, Lydina measures between 71.38 and 97.18 kilometers in diameter and its surface has an albedo between 0.0318 and 0.0586.

The Collaborative Asteroid Lightcurve Link adopts the results obtained by IRAS, that is, an albedo of 0.0586 and a diameter of 71.38 kilometers based on an absolute magnitude of 9.43.

Naming 

This minor planet was named after Lydia Il'inichna Albitskaya, wife of the discoverer Vladimir Albitsky (1891–1952). No accurate naming citation was given for this asteroid in The Names of the Minor Planets. The author of the Dictionary of Minor Planets, Lutz Schmadel, learned about the naming circumstances from Nikolai Chernykh (1931–2004), who was himself a prolific long-time astronomer at Nauchnij, Crimea.

Notes

References

External links 
 Asteroid Lightcurve Database (LCDB), query form (info )
 Dictionary of Minor Planet Names, Google books
 Asteroids and comets rotation curves, CdR – Observatoire de Genève, Raoul Behrend
 Discovery Circumstances: Numbered Minor Planets (1)-(5000) – Minor Planet Center
 
 

001028
Lydina
Lydina
001028
19231106